Cultural enrichment can refer to:

 The generally understood objective within Arts in education to expose children to the arts
 Culture change, a term used in public policy making that regards the role of culture on individual and community behavior
 Cultural pluralism, when a society has subset groups that maintain a unique cultural identity and values
 Acculturation, a process of culture change that describes how members of a minority culture adapt to the prevailing societal culture
 Multiculturalism, a term in sociology which is synonymous with ethnic pluralism 
 Cultural diffusion, a concept by Leo Frobenius where culture is shared between individuals
 Cultural diplomacy, a type of diplomacy which is a cultural exchange among different nations
 Cultural appropriation, the adoption of elements from one culture by members of another

See also 
 Polyculturalism
 Culture (disambiguation)